Santa Gertrudis de Fruitera is a small village in the central region of the Spanish island of Ibiza.

References

Populated places in Ibiza
Towns in Spain